Prasanna Venkatesan, often credited mononymously as Prasanna, is an Indian actor who works predominantly in the Tamil film industry and alongside appeared in a few Telugu, Malayalam and Kannada films.

He made his first success in Five Star in 2002, which was produced by Mani Ratnam. Some of his other notable films are Kannum Kannum, Cheena Thaana 001,  Kanda Naal Mudhal, Naanga Romba Busy and Naanayam. Apart from lead roles, he has also played villain roles. His film  Achchamundu! Achchamundu!, in which he starred alongside Sneha and American actor John Shea, was screened at many International film festivals, such as Shanghai and Cairo International Film Festival.

Early life and background 
Prasanna was born in Tiruchirappalli. His father was an employee in BHEL and his mother is a homemaker. He completed his schooling from BHEL Matriculation Higher Secondary School, Tiruchirappalli. He has a younger brother. Prasanna was good at mimicry and acting, when he was in school and college. He had stated that he always wanted to become an actor. He was an EEE student in Saranathan College of Engineering, Tiruchirapalli, when he responded to an open audition for actors in Susi Ganesan's Five Star (2002), although his parents were unhappy with his decision.

Film career 
Five Star, produced by Mani Ratnam's Madras Talkies, featured Prasanna alongside four other newcomers, most notably Kanika; it was well received by critics and performed modestly at the box office. His next two films Ragasiyamai (2003) and Kadhal Dot Com (2004), did not fare well commercially. After Five Star, his noteworthy performance came in Azhagiya Theeye (2004). He cites that the time between Five Star and Azhagiya Theeye was "a painful one", since the roles offered to him were "not the ones" he wanted to play. The film, involving an ensemble cast, was produced by Prakash Raj's Duet Movies and directed by Radha Mohan. Critics commented that he had improved in emoting, labelling his "voice modulation in the humorous scenes" as "impressive". Prakash Raj, impressed by his performance in the film, offered him the lead character in his next production Kanda Naal Mudhal, too. The triangular love story, directed by the newcomer V. Priya, costarring Laila and Karthik Kumar was a commercial success. The film ran for one-hundred days. The comedy flick Cheena Thaana 001, co-starring Sheela and Vadivelu was his only 2007 release.

In 2008, Prasanna was seen in three films. He starred in Siddique's comedy thriller Sadhu Miranda.  His role of a modern-day villain was a huge hit in Mysskin's film Anjathe (2008). His negative role was critically acclaimed and fetched him a nomination at the 56th Filmfare Awards South in the Best Supporting Actor category. Later that year, he starred in G. Marimuthu's Kannum Kannum. Regarding his performance, a critic noted that "Prasanna oozes sincerity and his ability to bring the Sathya and Murthy character to life with all the nuances of love, tenderness, humour and frustrations is one of the highlights of the film". He played the lead in Arun Vaidyanathan's Achchamundu! Achchamundu! (2009) opposite Sneha that dealt with the subject of paedophiles. It received rave reviews, and was very well received internationally, but failed at the domestic box office. Manjal Veyil also failed to be successful. During the period, he also worked as a voice actor, speaking dubbing for Aryan Rajesh in Cheran's Pokkisham on the insistence of the director. Then, alongside Sibiraj as antagonist, he starred in Shakthi Soundar Rajan's Naanayam as a protagonist produced by S.P.B. Charan's Capital Film Works.

In Bale Pandiya, directed by Siddharth Chandrasekhar, Prasanna was replaced by Vishnu Vishal. He was seen in a supporting role as a local gangster in Baana Kaathadi. A review from Times of India wrote that "with his eyes-to-die-for and underplayed violence, Prasanna easily steals the show". In 2011, he performed a lead role alongside director-actor Cheran in the thriller film Muran. His character, a "spoiled brat" and son of a millionaire, again had negative shades. He was also approached for Lucky Jokers, which he could not take due to his busy schedule with Muran. He has been approached to play a vital role in the Malayalam Vellaripravinte Changathi, but eventually did not star in the film. In 2013, he played a doctor in the Chennaiyil Oru Naal, a remake of the Malayalam film Traffic (2011). The film featured an ensemble cast and released to positive reviews. That same year, he made his Telugu debut with Bhai and starred in the successful romantic comedy Kalyana Samayal Saadham. Regarding his performance, a critic stated that "Prasanna deserves special credit for playing a role that most actors would hesitate to take up".

2014 saw the release of Pulivaal and the long delayed Netru Indru; both films featured himself and Vimal in the lead. The former was directed by Marimuthu and was based on the Malayalam film Chaappa Kurishu (2011). While Pulivaal released to positive reviews, Netru Indru released to negative reviews. His subsequent films released to positive reviews: Pa Paandi, Nibunan, Thupparivaalan, and Thiruttu Payale 2. His performance in Thirittu Payale 2 fetched him the Filmfare Award for Best Supporting Actor – Tamil. He returned to Telugu cinema with Jawaan, which featured him as the antagonist and released to negative reviews. In 2018, he starred in Kaalakkoothu; he was cast after Shaam left the film. The film received mixed reviews upon release. In 2019, he starred in the Telugu film Viswamitra and made his Malayalam debut with Brother's Day. Brothers Day released to mixed reviews. In 2020, he starred in Mafia: Chapter 1, which received mixed reviews upon release followed by Naanga Romba Busy (2020).

Personal life 
During the filming of Achchamundu! Achchamundu! it was reported that he fell in love with Sneha, but he denied the idea of marrying an actress.

Prasanna eventually married Sneha on 11 May 2012. His son Vihaan was born on 10 August 2015 and his daughter was born on 24 January 2020.

Filmography

As actor

As voice over artist

Television series

Television

References

External links 
 

Living people
21st-century Indian male actors
Male actors from Tiruchirappalli
International Tamil Film Award winners
Male actors in Tamil cinema
Tamil male actors
1982 births
Recipients of the Kalaimamani Award